Houli District is a rural district in northwestern Taichung City, Taiwan.

History
After the handover of Taiwan from Japan to the Republic of China in 1945, Houli was organized as a rural township of Taichung County named Neipu Township. On 1 October 1955, Neipu Township was renamed as Houli Township. On 25 December 2010, Taichung County was merged with Taichung City and Houli was upgraded to a district of the city.

Administrative divisions 
Guangfu, Renli, Yili, Yide, Houli, Houli, Duntung, Dunxi, Dunnan, Dunbei, Zhonghe, Jiushe, Liange, Taiping, Meishan, Yuemei, Gongguan and Taian Village.

Local products 
 Sugar cane
 grapes and wine
 soybean

Industrial products 
 Iron plants
 Musical instrument manufacturing. Known locally for Saxophones.

Military stables 
Military stables (后里馬場) were built in Houli in mid 1950s and function until today. Stables' main stock includes some of the horses that were given to Taiwan as a gift from Arabia.

Tourist attractions 
 Chang Lien-cheng Saxophone Museum
 Lihpao Land
 From 3 November 2018 to 24 April 2019 it will host the Taichung World Flora Exposition

Notable people 
 Huang Shu-kuang: Admiral, the current Chief of the General Staff

Events 
 2017 Taichung International Flower Carpet Festival
 2018 Taichung World Flora Exposition

Transportation 

 TRA Houli Station
 TRA Tai'an Station
Taiwan High Speed Rail passes through the western part of the district, but no station is currently planned.

See also 
 Taichung

References

External links 

  

Districts of Taichung